Martin Andersson (born 16 January 1981) is a Swedish retired footballer who played for IF Elfsborg as a defender.

References

External links

Elite Prospects profile

1981 births
Living people
Swedish footballers
Association football defenders
IF Elfsborg players